Events during the year 2017 in Bhutan.

Incumbents
 Monarch: Jigme Khesar Namgyel Wangchuck
 Prime Minister: Tshering Tobgay

References

 
Bhutan
Bhutan
2010s in Bhutan
Years of the 21st century in Bhutan